The Matra MS84 was the fifth Formula One car produced by Matra (following the MS9, MS10, MS11 and MS80).

Development
The car was built at Matra's Formula One base at Vélizy-Villacoublay in the southwestern suburbs of Paris, designed under the direction of Bernard Boyer and built by Jean Bee (a.k.a. "Bunny") under the direction of Legan. It was run by the Matra International team of Ken Tyrrell with full technical support from Matra and the financial backing of Elf.

Although it has a family resemblance with the MS80 with which Matra won the 1969 Constructors' Championship, it is a completely different car with a steel tube chassis instead of an aluminium monocoque. At the back the engine is mounted back-to-front with the gearbox and transfer case directly behind the driver. The four wheel drive system was designed by Derek Gardner of Harry Ferguson Research. The Ferguson transmission and other necessary additions left the car much heavier than the two-wheel drive MS80s (635 kg with no fuel).

Racing history
Like the Lotus 63, the MS84 made its first appearance at the Dutch Grand Prix, where Jackie Stewart tried the car out but opted to use his MS80, as he would for the rest of the season.

The car was still present at all the remaining races as a spare, and at Silverstone Jean-Pierre Beltoise gave the car its first race and came home ninth, six laps behind Stewart's two-wheel drive Matra (but three laps ahead of John Miles's Lotus 63). By the next time the car raced, the front differential had been disconnected and the car effectively ran as an over-weight MS80 with inboard front brakes, memorably giving the lie to Johnny Servoz-Gavin's protestations about the 4WD car being "undriveable" after he finished the Canadian Grand Prix six laps down in sixth place. Servoz-Gavin also drove the car at Watkins Glen, finishing 16 laps down and unclassified, and finally in Mexico, crossing the line "just" two laps down in eighth place. Although there was a project for a 4WD Matra MS 124, the MS84 was never replaced.

Complete Formula One World Championship results
(key)

 Includes 9 points scored using a Matra MS10 and 57 points scored using a Matra MS80.

References
Matra : La Saga by José Rosinski - E.T.A.I. 2001
Information about the MS84 at primotipo.com

Specific

Matra MS084
Formula One championship-winning cars
All-wheel-drive vehicles